The gare de Lourdes is a railway station in Lourdes, Occitanie, France. The station is on the Toulouse–Bayonne railway line. The station is served by TGV (high speed trains), Intercités de Nuit (night trains), Intercités (long distance) and TER (local) services operated by the SNCF.

The station is important for those coming to Lourdes on Catholic pilgrimages, with extra trains running to Lourdes at certain times.

Train services
The following services currently call at Lourdes:
TGV services Paris - Saint-Pierre-des-Corps - Bordeaux - Dax - Pau - Tarbes
intercity services (Intercités) Hendaye–Bayonne–Pau–Tarbes–Toulouse
local service (TER Nouvelle-Aquitaine) Bodreaux-Dax-Pau–Tarbes
local service (TER Nouvelle-Aquitaine) Bayonne–Pau–Tarbes
local service (TER Occitanie) Toulouse–Saint-Gaudens–Tarbes–Pau

References

Railway stations in Hautes-Pyrénées
Railway Station
Railway stations in France opened in 1866